Jacqueline Victoire Brookes (July 24, 1930 – April 26, 2013) was an American film, television, and stage actress, best known for her work both off-Broadway and on Broadway.

Life and career
Brookes was born in Montclair, New Jersey, the daughter of Maria Victoire (née Zur Haar) and Frederick Jack Brookes, an investment banker. She attended a French-speaking school in New York and spoke fluent French. She chose to attend the University of Iowa, graduating with a Bachelor of Fine Arts. Then she went to London on a Fulbright Scholarship to study at the Royal Academy of Dramatic Arts.

During the 1960s, she spent several summers acting in the Shakespeare Festival at the Old Globe Theater in San Diego, performing in plays such as Antony and Cleopatra, A Winter's Tale, The Merchant of Venice, A Midsummer Night's Dream, The Merry Wives of Windsor, and Richard III. During that era, she also performed Rosalind in As You Like It at the New Mexico State University, Katherine in The Taming of the Shrew at the University of British Columbia, and Beatrice in Much Ado About Nothing at the Shakespeare Festival in Stratford, Connecticut.

Jacqueline Brookes in later years was a teacher at the Circle in the Square Theatre School as well as a life member of The Actors Studio.

Brookes appeared in the films Ghost Story, The Entity, Paternity, The Good Son, and Losing Isaiah.

She died at age 82 from lymphoma.

Awards
She received her Theatre World Award in 1955 for The Cretan Woman and won an Obie Award for Best Actress in 1963 for Six Characters in Search of an Author.

Filmography

A Flame in the Wind (1964-65, TV Series) - Flora Perkins
As the World Turns (1969-73, TV Series) - Miss Thompson
The Secret Storm (1971-72, TV Series) - Ursula Winthrop
The Hospital (1971, TV Series) - Dr. Immelman (uncredited)
Parades (1972) - Mrs. Novik (uncredited)
The Werewolf of Washington (1973) - Angela - Publisher
The Gambler (1974) - Naomi Freed
All My Children (1974, TV Series) - Dr. Mary Hansen
Another World (1975, TV Series) - Beatrice Gordon
Looking Up (1977) - Becky
A Death in Canaan (1978, TV Movie) - Mildred Carston
Last Embrace (1979) - Dr. Coopersmith
Paternity (1981) - Aunt Ethel
Ghost Story (1981) - Milly
Love and Money (1982) - Mrs. Paultz
The Entity (1982) - Dr. Cooley
Ryan's Hope (1982, TV Series) - Sister Mary Joel
Without a Trace (1983) - Margaret Mayo
License to Kill (1984, TV Movie) - Judge Miriam Roth
Jack and Mike (1986, TV Series) - Nora Adler
American Playhouse (1987, TV Series) - Mrs. Connaloe
Sea of Love (1989) - Helen's Mother
Law & Order (1990, TV Series) - Judge Grace Larkin
The Naked Gun 2½: The Smell of Fear (1991) - Commissioner Brumford
All My Children (1991, TV Series) - Judge Irene Singer
Star Trek: The Next Generation (1992, TV Series) (Episode: The First Duty) - Admiral Brand
Whispers in the Dark (1992) - Lorraine McDowell
The Good Son (1993) - Alice Davenport
Losing Isaiah (1995) - Judge Silbowitz (final film role)

References

External links

Jacqueline Brookes profile at the Internet Off-Broadway Database
Obituary in  The New York Times

1930 births
2013 deaths
Actresses from New Jersey
American film actresses
American stage actresses
American television actresses
People from Montclair, New Jersey
University of Iowa alumni
Deaths from lymphoma
Deaths from cancer in New York (state)
Alumni of RADA
21st-century American women